Melaleuca alsophila, commonly known as the saltwater paperbark, is a plant in the myrtle family, Myrtaceae and is endemic to the north of Western Australia. It is a dense shrub or small tree with fibrous or papery bark and is common in areas seasonally inundated during the wet season.

Description
They are typically oval to tear-drop shaped, tapering near the stem.

The flowers are cream to white, in small dense heads. The stamens are arranged in five bundles around the flowers and in this species there are 9 to 16 stamens per bundle.

Taxonomy and naming
The description was formally applied in 1866 by George Bentham in Flora Australiensis. The specific epithet (alsophila) is from the Greek alsos, meaning "grove" and philos "loving", referring to the habitat of the species.

Distribution and habitat
Saltwater paperbark is found on sandy, often saline soils along watercourses, in swamps, on floodplains, coastal flats, and various saline habitats. It occurs in the Central Kimberley, Dampierland, Northern Kimberley, Victoria Bonaparte, Great Sandy Desert and Pilbara biogeographic regions of Western Australia.

Indigenous uses
Aboriginal people in the Kimberley region knew the plant to be a favourite resting place for pigeons and they used its trunk to build shelters. Native, stingless bees often make their hives in the trunk and branches. The bark can be used as a mosquito repellant and an infusion of its leaves is used to relieve the symptoms of a cold.

Conservation status
Melaleuca alsophila is classified as "not threatened" by the Government of Western Australia Department of Parks and Wildlife.

References

alsophila
Myrtales of Australia
Plants described in 1866
Endemic flora of Western Australia